Cainiao Smart Logistics Network Limited, formerly known as China Smart Logistics Network, is a Chinese logistics company launched by Alibaba Group, jointly with eight other companies, on 28 May 2013. As of May 2018, Cainiao was one of the largest unicorn companies in China, valued at 100 billion yuan.

Cainiao ensures delivery within 24 hours to any region of China. The company also shares resources with other logistics companies.

Accidents and incidents 
On 8 January 2022, Aviastar-TU Flight 6534, a Cainiao leased Tupolev Tu-204 caught fire during pushback for a flight from Hangzhou Xiaoshan International Airport to Tolmachevo Airport. None of the 8 occupants on board were injured, but the aircraft was written off.

References

External links

Logistics companies of China
Chinese companies established in 2013
Alibaba Group
Companies based in Hangzhou
2013 establishments in Hong Kong